Cybaeus balkanus is a spider species found in Bulgaria, Serbia and Macedonia.

See also 
 List of Cybaeidae species

References

External links 

Cybaeidae
Spiders described in 1997
Spiders of Europe